

USA-224, also known as NROL-49, is an American reconnaissance satellite. Launched in 2011 to replace the decade-old USA-161 satellite, it is the fifteenth KH-11 optical imaging satellite to reach orbit.

Project history and cost 
After the Boeing-led Future Imagery Architecture program failed in 2005, the National Reconnaissance Office ordered two more KH-11s. Critics worried that each of these "exquisite-class" satellites would cost more than the Navy's latest aircraft carrier ( in 2005, or about 
$ today). Instead, USA-224–the first of these two–was completed by Lockheed  under the initial budget estimate and two years ahead of schedule.

Launch 
USA-224 was launched atop a Delta IV Heavy rocket from Vandenberg AFB Space Launch Complex 6 in California. The launch was conducted by United Launch Alliance, and was the first flight of a Delta IV Heavy from Vandenberg. Liftoff occurred on 20 January 2011 at 21:10:30 UTC. Upon reaching orbit, the satellite received the International Designator 2011-002A.

The satellite began operating 33 days after its predecessor, USA-161, stopped doing its primary mission. This coverage gap was much smaller than originally feared, thanks to USA-224's earlier-than-planned launch and operational changes to extend the lifetime of USA-161.

As the fifteenth KH-11 satellite to be launched, USA-224 is a member of one of the later block configurations occasionally identified as being a separate system. Details of its mission and orbit are classified, but amateur observers have tracked it in low Earth orbit.

Imaging of Safir launch preparation accident

On 30 August 2019, President Donald Trump tweeted a classified picture from an intelligence briefing showing the aftermath of an accident that apparently occurred during launch preparations of a Safir rocket at the Imam Khomeini Spaceport a day earlier. According to analysts, the photo is likely to have been taken by USA-224. The opinion is based on a close agreement between the estimated time when the photo was taken (based on the orientation of shadows cast by structures in the photo), and the location of the satellite at that same time, as estimated with tracking data maintained by the amateur satellite watching community. The  photograph stands out for its high-resolution (estimated by analysts to be 10 cm or less per pixel), sharpness and lack of atmospheric distortion. Before this tweet, the only KH-11 imagery available was leaked in 1984, and the only declassified imagery available in public domain was released in 2011 taken by KH-9.

See also

List of NRO Launches
2011 in spaceflight

References

National Reconnaissance Office satellites
Spacecraft launched in 2011
Spacecraft launched by Delta IV rockets
USA satellites